Nanakramguda Financial District is an information technology, real estate and architectural suburb in Serlingampally mandal,  in Hyderabad, India.

History
Nanakramguda and Gachibowli were the areas which were part of the first phase of the financial district. The first phase is home to TSI Business Parks, special economic zones, and the WaveRock Building, which houses multinational conglomerates. WaveRock is a 2.5 million square foot Information Technology-Special Economic Zone in Nanakramguda covering about 12 acres. The special economic zone houses over 25 information technology companies including Apple, GAP, Accenture, Development Bank of Singapore, and DuPont, and has close to 25,000 to 30,000 employees working out of the premises. In December 2019, WaveRock was bought by the Shapoorji Pallonji Real Estate Fund for Rs 1,800 crore from Tishman Speyer.

Companies and IT Parks
ICICI Bank also has Asia's biggest work place with over 4,000,000 square feet of space. The Nanakramguda Village, Film Nagar, and Nanakramguda temple are nearby. Major hospitals like Continental Hospital, Care and AIG are in the vicinity. SAS iTower, a high-rise commercial complex is on Khajaguda-Nanakramguda Road.

The US consulate in Hyderabad will be shifting to its own building in Nanakramguda on 20 March 2023. Spread across a 12.3-acre site, it will be the largest US consular processing campus in-South East Asia, both in terms of the number of visa windows and in area. The current US consulate campus in historic Paigah Palace in Chiran Fort Club lane in Begumpet will be shifted to Nanakramguda.

On 21 August 2019, Amazon opened its largest campus in the world at Nanakramguda. It is the first Amazon-owned campus located outside the United States and features the largest Amazon-owned building in the world. The 9.7 acre campus houses over 15,000 employees.

Google's new Hyderabad facility in the Financial District, Nanakramguda will be a 3.3 Million sft energy efficient campus built with sustainability. Google acquired the 7.3-acre site in 2019.

Other sights
 Sri Ranganadha swamy temple, Nanakramguda
 Flipside Adventure Park, ISB Rd, Financial District.

See also
 Telangana State Industrial Infrastructure Corporation
 Kokapet
 Gowlidoddy
 Gopanpally
 Genome Valley
 GIFT City
 Hyderabad Pharma City

References

Neighbourhoods in Hyderabad, India
Ranga Reddy district
Financial districts in India
Central business districts in India